Illgen City is an unincorporated community in Beaver Bay Township, Lake County, Minnesota, United States.

The community is located northeast of the city of Silver Bay at the junction of Minnesota Highway 61 and Minnesota Highway 1, on the North Shore of Lake Superior. Illgen City is also located 33 miles northeast of the city of Two Harbors.

Tettegouche State Park, the Baptism River, and the Palisade Head rock formation are all nearby, as is the community of Finland, Minnesota.

References

 Official State of Minnesota Highway Map – 2011/2012 edition

Unincorporated communities in Minnesota
Unincorporated communities in Lake County, Minnesota
Minnesota populated places on Lake Superior